Rayado or Reyado (older Ryado) was the first permanent settlement in Colfax County, New Mexico, United States and an important stop on the Santa Fe Trail. The name Rayado derives from the Spanish term for "streaked", perhaps in reference to the lot lines marked out by Lucien Maxwell.

Some of the land in the townsite was purchased by Waite Phillips in the 1920s and Phillips later donated it to the Boy Scouts of America and it became part of the Philmont Scout Ranch.

Today, Rayado is the home of the Kit Carson Museum including his reconstructed home, and La Posta, a Santa Fe Trail stage stop dating from the 1850s.

Background
Rayado is located where the mountain branch of the Santa Fe Trail intersects with the Cimarron Trail to Fort Leavenworth.

One mile to the south is a classic southwestern butte, called Kit Carson Mesa.

Rayado was founded by Lucien Maxwell in 1848 at the end of the Mexican–American War, as the first plains settlement in New Mexico east of the mountain valleys of the Sangre de Cristo Mountains. Because the plains were still subject to raids by Apache, Comanche and other Indians, he had difficulty attracting settlers, so he convinced Kit Carson to move down from Taos in 1849 to lend an air of safety to the enterprise.

Maxwell married his bride Luis Beaubien (daughter of Carlos Beaubien) in Rayado and they lived there before moving to Cimarron. A federal garrison post was established in Rayado in 1850 and lasted until Fort Union was opened.

Jesus Gil Abreu who also married a Beaubien daughter had his Abreu Ranch house there on the banks of the Rayado Creek from 1859 until his death in 1911. There was a post office there from 1873 to 1919.

References

External links 
 

Unincorporated communities in New Mexico
Unincorporated communities in Colfax County, New Mexico